Parakala Matha, officially Bramhatantra Swatantra Parakala Matha, is a Vaishnava monastery established during the Hoysala Empire in 1268 at Mysore, Karnataka, primarily worshipping Lord Hayagreeva along with his consort Goddess Lakshmi. It is the first mediaeval era monastery of the Vadakalai denomination within Vaishnavism in the Hindu society and is the gurupeeta, the seat of the raja guru or royal mentor, of the maharajas of Mysore.

Originally founded in Mysore where its headquarters has been based, the matha now has branches across southern India and as well as one abroad.

Etymology 
Parakala is a Sanskrit adjective meaning "beyond time". It is another theonym for Lord Vishnu and his incarnation as Lord Narasimha, derivatively meaning "He who is beyond time". Alvar Tirumangai, an influential figure in the matha's history, earned parakala as a title for his scholarship, after whom the matha thus came to be known as Parakala Matha.

History 
Parakala Matha was first established by Sri Brahmatantra Swatantra Jeeyar, a disciple of Swami Vedanta Desika, during the reign of the Hoysala emperor Narasimha III. It is among the monasteries that view Vedanta Desika as the torchbearer of Āchārya Ramanuja's Vishishtadvaita teachings, the others being Ahobila Matha at Ahobilam, Andavan Ashramam at Srirangam,  and Andavan Ashramam at Poundarikapuram. The Hayagriva idol worshipped at the matha is said to have been handed down from Vedanta Desika himself.

Āchārya tradition 
There have been a total of thirty-six āchāryas (pontiffs or principal seers) so far.

The head of the matha is also the hereditary raja guru of the Mysore Royal Family. The matha thus has had a close relationship with the monarchs of Mysore Kingdom since 1399, one of the reasons for the proximity of Jaganmohana Palace and Mysore Palace to it. Most of the royal ceremonies are officiated by the matha.

List of āchāryas

See also 
 Sri Vaishnavism
 Ramanuja
 Vedanta Desika
 Ahobila Matha
 Srirangam Srimad Andavan Ashramam
 List of Heritage Buildings in Mysore

References

Sri Vaishnavism
Hindu monasteries in India